John Ruaridh Grant Mackenzie, 5th Earl of Cromartie (born 12 June 1948) is a Scottish engineer and peer. He is the current chief of Clan Mackenzie.

Early life
He is the only child of Roderick Mackenzie, 4th Earl of Cromartie and his second wife, the former Olga (née Laurence) Mendoza (d. 1996). His mother, who was previously married to Peter Mendoza, was a daughter of Stuart Laurance of Paris. From his father's first marriage to Dorothy Downing Porter, he has two elder half-sisters, Lady Julia Blunt-Mackenzie and Lady Gilean Blunt-Mackenzie.

His paternal grandmother was Lady Sibell Lilian Mackenzie, suo jure Countess of Cromartie, who married his grandfather, Lt.-Col. Edward Walter Blunt later Blunt-Mackenzie DL (the eldest son of Maj.-Gen. Charles Harris Blunt of Adderbury Manor).

He was educated at Rannoch School, Perthshire and at Strathclyde University, Glasgow, Lanarkshire, Scotland.

Career
Lord Cromartie is registered as a Member of the Institution of Explosives Engineers (M.I.Exp.E.) as an explosives engineer.

He has held the position of Chief of Clan Mackenzie since 1980, wrote the book Selected Climbs in Skye, published in 1982. He succeeded to the titles of 5th Baron Castlehaven, of Castlehaven, 5th Viscount Tarbat, of Tarbat, 5th Baron MacLeod of Castle Leod, and 5th Earl of Cromartie on 13 December 1989.

The seat of the Earl is at Castle Leod, Strathpeffer, Ross-shire.

Personal life

Cromartie married firstly Helen Murray, daughter of John Murray, a steelworker at Lanarkshire, in 1973, and divorced in 1983, by whom he had an only son:

 Hon. Kenneth Mackenzie (1980–1980), who died in infancy.

He married secondly Janet Clare Harley, daughter of Christopher James Harley of Strathpeffer, Ross-shire, in 1985. They have two sons:

 Colin Ruaridh Mackenzie, Viscount Tarbat (b. 1987)
 Hon. Alasdair Kenelm Stuart Mackenzie (b. 1989)

References

People educated at Rannoch School
Alumni of the University of Strathclyde
Scottish engineers
British geologists
Living people
People from Ross and Cromarty
1948 births
Explosives engineers
Earls of Cromartie (1861)

Cromartie